Harold Armstrong (born October 22, 1969) better known as DMG (short for DetriMental Ganxta), is an American rapper formally signed to Rap-a-Lot Records.

Career
DMG got his break when he met Scarface after a concert. Scarface got DMG a record deal with Rap-a-Lot, where he released his debut album in 1993 entitled Rigormortiz. The album reached Billboard's R&B and Heatseekers charts. Two years later, DMG was invited to join Facemob, a rap group featuring rappers from different regions. Facemob's debut album, The Other Side of the Law was released in 1996 and peaked at 51 on the Billboard 200. After the Facemob, DMG continued making guest appearances on Rap-a-Lot albums throughout the late 90s and early 2000s. DMG returned to Rap-a-Lot in 2002, participating on Facemob's second album, Silence. The following year DMG released his second album, Black Roulette.

Discography

Studio albums

Collaboration albums

References

External links
[ DMG at allmusic.com]

African-American male rappers
Horrorcore artists
Living people
Rappers from Minnesota
Gangsta rappers
1969 births
Midwest hip hop musicians
21st-century American rappers
21st-century American male musicians
21st-century African-American musicians
20th-century African-American people